The Human Rights Protection Department is the Department of the Ministry of Internal Affairs of Georgia, created on 11 January 2018. The Director of the Department is Ms. Londa Toloraia.

Activities 
The Human Rights Protection Department of the Ministry of Internal Affairs ensures timely response and effective investigation into the particular categories of cases:
Domestic violence
Violence against women
 Crimes committed on discrimination ground
Trafficking
 Offense committed by/against juveniles.

In order to render timely respond and ensure the effective investigation the Department:
 Carries out the monitoring of investigation and administrative proceedings;
 Analyzes the results of monitoring, on the basis of which it schedules the various future activities (e.g.: legislative, preventive, and other) ;
 Informs the results of the monitoring to all persons dealing with crimes and administrative violations fallen under the competence of the Department;
 Develop recommendations for identifying the faults in the monitoring process;
 Based on the monitoring results, determines the needs of the training of investigators and participates in their qualification raising process;
 Identifies the Investigators who may be encouraged for faithful performance of their duties;
 Develop proposals, strategies and action plans for ensuring the prevention and effective investigation of the above-mentioned crimes;
 Organizes and carries out preventive measures;
 Reviews citizens' statements and complaints, if necessary, meets them;
 Cooperates with all state agencies, non-governmental and international organizations working on issues related to the competence of the Department.

Contact details 
Any citizen can send any proposal, initiative to the e-mail address of the Human Rights Protection Department aimed at more efficient action against the offense under the competence of the Department.
 E-mail: adamianisuflebebi@mia.gov.ge

Notes and references

External links 
 About the Ministry
 Mission and Strategy

2018 establishments in Georgia (country)
Government agencies established in 2018
Internal affairs ministries
Government agencies of Georgia (country)